The Carnegie Free Library of Allegheny is situated in the Allegheny Center neighborhood of Pittsburgh, Pennsylvania. It was commissioned in 1886, the first Carnegie library to be commissioned in the United States. Donated to the public by entrepreneur Andrew Carnegie, it was built from 1886 to 1890 on a design by John L. Smithmeyer and Paul J. Pelz.

The library and musical conservatory was built of red and grey granite from Maine. The contractor was Vinalhaven, Maine's Bodwell Granite Company, which had furnished granite for major public works including the State, War and Navy Department building in Washington, DC., now called the Eisenhower Executive Office Building.     
 
It did not open until 1890 thus making it the second Carnegie library to open. The first one to open being the Carnegie Free Library of Braddock, built for steel-workers in Braddock, 9 miles up the Monongahela River from Pittsburgh.

The building also features the first Carnegie Music Hall in the United States. The Music Hall at the Braddock Library would not open until an 1893 expansion of that structure.

The running costs were met from local taxes – unlike the Carnegie Library in Braddock, which received an endowment from Carnegie. After a mid-2000s lightning strike, the library was moved to a new building a few blocks north on Federal Street. Following the move, the New Hazlett Theater was the primary tenant. In April 2019, the Children's Museum of Pittsburgh opened Museum Lab, a makerspace for youth aged 10+.

It was listed on the National Register of Historic Places in 1974.

Gallery

References

Library buildings completed in 1889
Libraries on the National Register of Historic Places in Pennsylvania
Carnegie libraries in Pennsylvania
Clock towers in Pennsylvania
Romanesque Revival architecture in Pennsylvania
Libraries in Pittsburgh
Libraries in Allegheny County, Pennsylvania
City of Pittsburgh historic designations
Pittsburgh History & Landmarks Foundation Historic Landmarks
National Register of Historic Places in Pittsburgh
1889 establishments in Pennsylvania